Xsnow is a software application that creates the appearance of snow falling on the elements of the graphical user interface of a computer system. Xsnow was originally created as a virtual greeting card for Macintosh systems in 1984. In 1993, the concept was ported to the X Window System as Xsnow, and was included on a number of Linux distributions in the late 1990s.

Licensing 
Even though Xsnow was distributed with earlier versions of Linux, its most recent versions are shareware Microsoft Windows and Mac OS X ports with added features. The Unix-based ports for versions <= 1.42 include the source code in order to allow compiling to other platforms, but the software is not considered free software in the strictest sense. 

Version 2.0.1 and higher are free software.

License 
Xsnow version <= 1.42: Xsnow is available freely and you may give it to other people as is, but I retain all rights. Therefore it does not classify as 'Public Domain' software. It *is* allowed to package Xsnow for Unix/Linux distributions, CD-Roms etc, and to make the necessary changes to makefiles etc. to facilitate this.

Versions 2.0.1 and higher use the GNU General Public Licence version 3.

Variants 
 At least one free variant with source code has been published for Windows by Revenger, Inc. This version is snow-only and does not use code from the Xsnow codebase.
 MacPorts has a source code build for Mac OS X that's not the shareware version.
 BSnow, a snow only replicant for BeOS is bundled with Haiku.
 Let It Snow! a snow-only variant for Android. This version does not use code from the Xsnow codebase.

See also
Neko (computer program)
XBill
XPenguins

References

External links 
 
 Original Xsnow homepage
 Snow for Windows
 iSnow for macOS / OS X
 Snow for Macintosh
 wsnow for browsers
 jsSnow for webpages

X Window programs
Desktop widgets